This is a list of wars and humanitarian conflicts involving the United Kingdom of Great Britain and Northern Ireland and its predecessor states (the Kingdom of Great Britain, Kingdom of England, Kingdom of Scotland and generally the British Isles). Notable militarised interstate disputes are included. For a list of wars that have been fought on the United Kingdom mainland, see the list of wars in Great Britain.

Historically, the United Kingdom relied most heavily on the Royal Navy and maintained relatively small land forces. Most of the episodes listed here deal with insurgencies and revolts in the various colonies of the British Empire.

During its history, the United Kingdom's forces (or forces with a British mandate) have invaded, had some control over or fought conflicts in 171 of the world's 193 countries that are currently UN member states, or nine out of ten of all countries.

England, Scotland and Wales to 1707

 List of battles between Scotland and England
 Anglo-Scottish Wars
 Anglo-Welsh Wars
 Tudor conquest of Ireland
 Wars of the Three Kingdoms, 1639–1660

Kingdom of Great Britain (1707–1801)

United Kingdom of Great Britain and Ireland (1801–1922)

United Kingdom of Great Britain and Northern Ireland (1922–present)

See also
 List of wars involving England
 List of wars in Great Britain
 Military history of the United Kingdom
 Declaration of war by the United Kingdom

Notes

References

Citations

Bibliography

Further reading
 Barnett, Correlli. Britain and her army, 1509–1970: a military, political and social survey (1970).
 Black, Jeremy. A military history of Britain: from 1775 to the present (2008).
 Bradford, James C. ed.  International Encyclopedia of Military History (2 vol. 2006).
 Brownstone, David and Irene Franck. Timelines of War: A Chronology of Warfare from 100,000 BC to the Present (1996), Global coverage.
 Cannon, John, ed. The Oxford Companion to British History (2003)
 Carlton, Charles. This Seat of Mars: War and the British Isles, 1485–1746 (Yale UP; 2011) 332 pages; studies the impact of near unceasing war from the individual to the national levels.
 Chandler, David G., and Ian Frederick William Beckett, eds. The Oxford history of the British army (Oxford UP, 2003).
 Cole, D. H and E. C Priestley. An outline of British military history, 1660–1936 (1936). online
 Dupuy, R. Ernest and Trevor N. Dupuy. The Harper Encyclopedia of Military History: From 3500 B.C. to the Present (1993).
 Fortescue, John William. History of the British Army from the Norman Conquest to the First World War (1899–1930), in 13 volumes with six separate map volumes. Available online for downloading; online volumes; The standard highly detailed full coverage of operations.
 Haswell, Jock, and John Lewis-Stempel. A Brief History of the British Army (2017).
 Higham, John, ed. A Guide to the Sources of British Military History  (1971) 654 pages excerpt; Highly detailed bibliography and discussion up to 1970; includes local and naval forces.
 James, Lawrence. Warrior Race: A History of the British at War (Hachette UK, 2010). excerpt
 Johnson, Douglas, et al.  Britain and France: Ten Centuries (1980)
 Mulligan, William, and Brendan Simms, eds. The Primacy of Foreign Policy in British History, 1660–2000 (Palgrave Macmillan; 2011) 345 pages
  timeline pp xix to xxxi
 Otte, T.G. The Makers of British Foreign Policy: From Pitt to Thatcher (2002)
 Ranft, Bryan. The Oxford Illustrated History of the Royal Navy (Oxford UP, 2002).
 Rodger, N. A.M. The safeguard of the sea: A naval history of Britain, 660–1649 (Vol. 1. 1998). excerpt
 Rodger, N.A.M.The Command of the Ocean: A Naval History of Britain, 1649–1815 (vol 2 2006) excerpt
 Sheppard, Eric William. A short history of the British army (1950). online
 Ward, A.W. and G.P. Gooch, eds. The Cambridge History of British Foreign Policy, 1783–1919 (3 vol, 1921–23), old detailed classic; vol 1, 1783–1815 ;  vol 2, 1815–1866; vol 3. 1866–1919

Historiography
 Messenger, Charles, ed. Reader's Guide to Military History (2001) pp 55–74 etc.; annotated guide to most important books.
 Schroeder, Paul W. "Old Wine in Old Bottles: Recent Contributions to British Foreign Policy and European International Politics, 1789–1848." Journal of British Studies 26.01 (1987): 1–25.

 
 
United Kingdom
United Kingdom history-related lists
United Kingdom military-related lists
Great Britain-related lists